The Berounka is a river in the Czech Republic,  long, the biggest left tributary of Vltava, draining an area of . It then continues with the name of Berounka until it enters the Vltava on the edge of Prague. Originally, the entire stream was called Mže, but in the 17th century the lower course started to be named after the town Beroun, lying upon it.

The river is a favourite destination among canoeists, who enjoy the picturesque sceneries around, especially when it flows along the Křivoklátsko Landscape Protected Area where three castle ruins tower over the Berounka river valley.

References

Rivers of the Central Bohemian Region
Rivers of the Plzeň Region